Muhammad Ibrahim (– 6 September 1989) was a Bangladeshi physician. He established Bangladesh Institute of Research and Rehabilitation in Diabetes, Endocrine and Metabolic Disorders (BIRDEM), the diabetes health-care and research institute complex in 1980. The Government of Bangladesh awarded him National Professor and the Independence Day Award in 1978.

Education
Ibrahim earned a Bachelor of Medicine degree in 1938. He became MRCP in 1949. He was made a Fellow of College of Chest Physicians (FCCP) in 1950.

Career 
Ibrahim established Diabetic Association of Pakistan (later Diabetic Association of Bangladesh) on 28 February 1956. He also founded Diabetic Association in Karachi and Lahore, West Pakistan, in 1964.

Ibrahim established the diabetes health-care and research institute complex, BIRDEM at Dhaka in 1980 where the out-patients centre of the Bangladesh Diabetic Association was shifted to. The institute is housed in two buildings, named the Ibrahim Memorial Diabetes Centre after his death in 1989. In recognition of its innovative, extensive and high quality service it was designated in 1982 as a "WHO-Collaborating Centre for Developing Community-oriented Programs for Prevention and Control of Diabetes." It is the first such centre in Asia. He  established the Bangladesh Institute of Research and Training for Applied Nutrition (BIRTAN) and Rehabilitation and Vocational Training Centre (RVTC) in Dhaka to develop low-cost nutrition, and to give vocational training to poor and unemployed diabetics.

Ibrahim served as an adviser to the president, with the rank of minister in-charge of the Ministry of Health and Population Control, in the mid-1970s.

Ibrahim took part in drafting the government's first population control policy and setting up National Population Council.

Ibrahim was a founder fellow at the Islamic World Academy of Sciences, Amman, Jordan  in 1986.

Awards
 Independence Day Award (1979)
 Gold Medal by Begum Zebunnesa and Kazi Mahbubullah Trust (1981)
 Gold Medal by Mahbub Ali Khan Memorial Trust (1985)
 Gold Medal by Comilla Foundation, Comilla (1986)
 Gold Medal by Khan Bahadur Ahsanullah Memorial Trust (1989)
 Gold Medal by Islamic Foundation Bangladesh (1989)

Personal life and legacy
Ibrahim's death anniversary is observed as the Diabetic Service Day to endorse and honor his contribution to socio-medicare services.

References 

1910s births
1989 deaths
Bangladeshi military doctors
National Professors of Bangladesh
Recipients of the Independence Day Award
Fellows of Bangladesh Academy of Sciences
Honorary Fellows of Bangla Academy
Burials at Banani Graveyard
Academic staff of the University of Liberal Arts Bangladesh
Bangladeshi people of Indian descent